The term  refers to a tree or sometimes forest as a shintai. 

They are often distinctly visible due to Shimenawas wrapped around them 

The term goshingi refers to trees that are considered sacred or divine in the precincts of Shinto shrines and jingūs of Shinto, as well as the forests that surround them and trees that are not grown for logging. It also refers to trees that are owned by shrines or by private individuals and have a special origin in folklore. It may also refer to trees that have been specially cut down for planting or growing wild to be used as timber for the construction of shrines.

Overview 
Nature worship, also known as Himikura Shinto, is a part of the ancient Shinto religion that originated in Japan. This form of worship is based on gratitude, fear, and respect for kami, life, and nature. Ancient Shinto practices involved using symbolic objects, such as trees, in places where the environment changed as vessels for Shinto bodies.

Over the course of thousands of years, the form and style of Shinto shrines and rituals have been influenced by foreign religions or established independently, leading to the development of various forms of Shinto. Today, there are tens of thousands of Shinto shrines in Japan, many of which were built on the site of shrines in ancient Shinto religion. These shrines may contain sacred trees, iwakura, rock formations, steles, or mounds, and serve as a testament to the history of nature worship in Japan.

In some cases, shrines may not have a physical structure, but rather worship a sacred tree in its natural state. Evergreen trees with pointed branches are often used as tamagushi in Shinto rituals, serving as a substitute for the gods to descend from. The most common type of tamagushi is the sakaki tree, but other species such as hisakaki and ogatama no ki  may be used in regions where sakaki does not grow naturally (areas north of the Kanto region).

In general, a tadakushi is a branch that has been cut down to be offered to the gods, while a sacred tree is one that is still rooted in the earth and worshiped by many people.

Yorishiro 
Kami-yorigi, kanjinboku, etc. are considered to be yorishiro of the gods, and are given special treatment in shimenawa. The Nageia nagi is a yorishiro of the gods, and is given special treatment in shimenawa. Many of them are Nageia nagi, mochinoki, and cedar.

In addition, some trees are treated as sacred trees, such as the cedar trees at Ise Grand Shrine, which are regarded as special trees separate from the gods in order to maintain the scenery or create a solemn atmosphere. For those who work in the mountains, a tree that stands out as a substitute for the god of the mountain may be temporarily treated as a sacred tree and enshrined.

The gohei, which is used in Shinto rituals and is made from sakaki and nagi, is also called a sacred tree, but it was originally a simple substitute for a naturally occurring sacred tree in ancient Shinto.

Divine realms and boundaries 
In ancient Shinto, the Shinto shrine was considered to be a Shinto shrine as a place where the gods dwelled, or a boundary between the everlasting world and the present world, and was feared and respected. In order to prevent people, things in this world, gods in this world, and things that bring misfortune and evil to this world from easily coming and going, shimenawa were hung as walls, making it a forbidden place. Even today, there are many places such as Okinoshima Island where not only the shrine, the sacred tree, or the forest of the local guardian, but the entire island is forbidden. In some places, rituals and festivals are held for a certain period of time when people want to bring good fortune and invite the gods in.

Tradition 
Refers to a tree with a special origin, such as in a folk tale. In addition, trees that were written about in poems by famous poets are treated as sacred trees. There are many trees such as the plum trees at Dazaifu Tenmangū that were written about by poets.

Memorial tree 
Trees donated by people who are related to the shrine are considered sacred and are treated as sacred trees.

Construction tree 
When building a shrine, the trees that will be used for its lumber are treated as sacred trees.

See also 
 Shintai
 Yorishiro
 Shinto shrine
 Chinju no Mori

References

Shinto religious objects
Trees in religion
Shinto shrines
Pages with unreviewed translations